Barnet Springs is an unincorporated community in Lincoln Parish, Louisiana, United States.

References

Unincorporated communities in Lincoln Parish, Louisiana
Unincorporated communities in Louisiana